The Virgen de los Angeles (Virgin of the Angels) is Costa Rica's patron saint, also known as La Negrita.

Dia de la Virgen de los Ángeles (English: Day of the Virgin of the Angels) is a Costa Rican holiday celebrating the Virgen.

Background
According to tradition, La Negrita, the Black Virgin, is a small (less than a meter tall), probably indigenous or mixed race, representation of the Virgin Mary found on 2 August 1635 by a native woman. As the story goes, when she tried to take the statuette with her, it miraculously reappeared twice back where she had found it. The townspeople then built a shrine around the statue.

In 1824, the Virgin was declared Costa Rica’s patron saint. La Negrita now resides on a gold, jewel-studded platform at the main altar in the Basílica de Nuestra Señora de los Ángeles in Cartago. Each 2 August, on the anniversary of the statuette’s miraculous discovery, pilgrims from every corner of the country (and beyond) walk the 22 km from San José to the basilica. Many of the penitent complete the last few hundred meters of the pilgrimage on their knees. This basilica is equally visited by tourists and locals.

Pope Pius XI authorized the canonical coronation of the image by decree of 20 October 1924, granted to Bishop Rafael Otón Castro y Jimenez. The coronation ceremony was carried out on 25 April 1926.

In 2014, a replica of the statue was enthroned in the Vatican City.

See also 
Black Madonna

References

External links 

Marian feast days
Titles of Mary
National holidays
August observances
Religious festivals in Costa Rica
Catholicism in Costa Rica